Christian Akande Kotchoni (born 20 July 1988 in Parakou) is a Beninese international football player who currently plays for Türk Ocağı.

Career 
Akane began his career with Cheminots Cotonou than joined in January 2008 to Denizlispor, played his first game in the Süper Lig on 13 January 2009 vs. Bursaspor and scored than on 10 February 2009 his first goal against Konyaspor. After six months was loaned out on 4 August 2008 to Kartalspor and played his first match on 1 September 2008 vs Altay Izmir. He left in summer 2009 the Turkey and his club Denizlispor to return to Benin, who signed for Requins de l'Atlantique FC.

References 

1988 births
Living people
Beninese footballers
Benin international footballers
Denizlispor footballers
Kartalspor footballers
Süper Lig players
Beninese expatriate sportspeople in Turkey
Expatriate footballers in Turkey
Nigerian people of Beninese descent
Beninese expatriate footballers
People from Parakou
Requins de l'Atlantique FC players
Association football forwards